George Valentine Williams, (1883–1946) was a journalist and writer of popular fiction.

Williams was born in 1883. He was the eldest son of the chief editor at Reuters; both his brother and an uncle were also journalists. He replaced Austin Harrison as the Reuters correspondent in Berlin in 1905, aged 21. In 1908, he left Reuters to join the Daily Mail, filing stories from Paris and covering the Portuguese revolution of 1910. He was in the Balkans at the outbreak of World War I and became one of the first accredited war correspondents in March 1915. William Beach Thomas had been reporting the war for the Daily Mail in the period before official accreditations were granted. When the British government relented its opposition to the presence of journalists in 1915, having been warned by Theodore Roosevelt that reporting limitations were affecting public opinion in the United States, Williams stepped into the role.

In December 1915, Williams enlisted for service in the Irish Guards and Beach Thomas took his place as an accredited reporter in France. Williams was awarded the Military Cross as a soldier and wrote two autobiographical books about his war-time experiences. In the aftermath of war, he travelled widely as a reporter, covering events such as the Versailles Peace Conference and the discovery of the tomb of Tutankhamen, as well as events in America. Harold Nicolson met him in connection with events at Versailles and described in a diary entry that "He is far too intelligent to be employed by such a paper" (the Daily Mail). It was during this period that he began writing thrillers and around 1926 he gave up his post as Foreign Editor of the Daily Mail to pursue a full-time career as an author.

Williams was too old for active service at the outbreak of World War II. He joined the Secret Intelligence Service, vetting potential new recruits such as Malcolm Muggeridge and Kim Philby. He was transferred to the British Embassy in Washington in 1941 but soon after left for Hollywood, where he worked as a scriptwriter for Twentieth-Century Fox and Metro-Goldwyn Mayer.

Williams was married to Alice Crawford. He died in 1946.

Selected works 

, as by G. Valentine Williams, 

, as by Douglas Valentine
; also known as Okewood of the Secret Service (US edition, 1919; Project Gutenberg, 2000)

 (also known as The Key Man)

 (also known as The Mysterious Miss Morrisot)

 (also known as The Mystery of the Gold Box)
. First published as a newspaper serial, (London) Daily News, 1932
 (with Dorothy Rice Sims)

 (also known as The Curiosity of Mr Treadgold)
 (autobiography)

References 
Notes

Citations

Bibliography

External links
 
 
 
 
 
Play The Man with the Club Foot by Valentine Williams on Great War Theatre

English war correspondents
Daily Mail journalists
English male screenwriters
English thriller writers
Secret Intelligence Service personnel
Recipients of the Military Cross
Irish Guards soldiers
British Army personnel of World War I
Reuters
1883 births
1946 deaths
20th-century English novelists
English male non-fiction writers
20th-century English screenwriters
20th-century English male writers